Male Sa'u (born 13 October 1987) is a Japanese professional rugby union footballer of Samoan descent. Sa'u can play both Centre and Fly-half. After Super Rugby stints with the Melbourne Rebels and the Blues, Sa'u has returned to the Top League for the 2016-2017 season with Yamaha Júbilo.

Playing career
Sa'u was educated at De La Salle College, Mangere East and was selected for Counties Manukau Steelers for the inaugural Air New Zealand Cup (now the Mitre 10 Cup) in 2006. Sa'u played his club rugby for the Patumahoe club. He was again selected for the 2007 season, where he played nine out of the ten matches. He played for New Zealand at under-19s level, and at under-20s level. He was also named in the under-21s Trial Squad in 2007.

He joined Japanese side Yamaha Júbilo in the Top League competition for the 2008–09 season, and played twelve time and scored 35 times in his debut season. On his departure in the 2013–14 season, he had scored 115 points over 46 matches. His form over the seasons, earned him a place in Eddie Jones Japanese 42-man squad for the 2013 Asian Five Nations. He made his debut against the Philippines on 20 April 2013.

In March 2014, Male Sa'u joined the Melbourne Rebels in the Super Rugby competition.

References

1987 births
Japanese rugby union players
Japanese people of Samoan descent
Living people
Japan international rugby union players
Counties Manukau rugby union players
Melbourne Rebels players
Rugby union centres
Rugby union wings
Japanese expatriates in Australia
Expatriate rugby union players in Australia
Shizuoka Blue Revs players
Blues (Super Rugby) players
People educated at Tangaroa College
Rugby union players from Auckland
Japanese expatriate rugby union players
Expatriate rugby union players in New Zealand
Toyota Verblitz players